Bindi Sue Irwin-Powell (born 24 July 1998) is an Australian television personality, conservationist, zookeeper and actress. She is the elder of the two children of the late conservationist and television personality Steve Irwin and his conservationist wife, Terri Irwin, who is currently the owner of Australia Zoo. Bindi's younger brother is Robert, a television personality and photographer, and she is the granddaughter of naturalist and herpetologist Bob Irwin.

When she was 9, Irwin hosted Bindi the Jungle Girl, a children's wildlife documentary TV series. She has also been involved in acting, singing, dancing, game show hosting, and has created two instructional fitness DVDs. She is also known for winning season 21 of Dancing with the Stars (US). She currently stars alongside her mother Terri and her younger brother Robert in Crikey! It's the Irwins.

Early life
Bindi Sue Irwin was born in Buderim, Queensland. Her first name comes from the name of her father's favourite female crocodile at Australia Zoo, and her middle name, Sue, is from the family's late dog Sui, who died in her sleep from cancer on 23 June 2004 at the age of 15. According to her father, Bindi is an Nyungar language word that means "young girl".

Irwin began appearing on television shows as early as age two. She appeared regularly in her father's television shows, including The Crocodile Hunter Diaries, and in the 2002 film The Wiggles: Wiggly Safari in a credited cast role. She is of English, Irish and Swedish ancestry, with abundance of Irish ancestry on her father's side. Irwin said about being a dual citizen (Australian-American), in an interview with Brisbane Times: "What's really nice is being a dual citizen both here and in the US so I think I get to vote there as well."

Bindi was eight years old when her father was killed by a stingray barb during the filming of an underwater documentary. On 20 September 2006, Irwin received a standing ovation after she delivered a eulogy for her father in front of a crowd of 5,000, and a worldwide television audience of more than 300 million viewers. In the 2006 TV Week readers' poll, her speech received 43 percent of votes and was voted the television moment of the year. Her mother stated that, apart from some assistance with typing, Irwin had written the speech herself.

Irwin was homeschooled until 2014, when she enrolled at TAFE Queensland East Coast. She has completed a Certificate III in Business, and in 2016 was studying for a Certificate III in Tourism.

Career
Irwin has been an active television personality and conservationist since a young age. She was the presenter of a 26-part wildlife documentary kids show called Bindi the Jungle Girl, a production of the Discovery Kids television network. Her father was filmed in many of the early shows before his death in September 2006, when production was temporarily put on hold. Bindi Irwin and her mother announced that she would continue her late father's conservation and television work.

The series premiered in June 2007 on Discovery Kids, with papers reporting that Steve Irwin had supported his daughter's career, saying "I just want to be co-star to my daughter". Irwin commits 10% of her wages to Wildlife Warriors, the charity founded by her family in 2002.

Music career
On 27 November 2006, Irwin released her debut album Bindi Kid Fitness with Steve Irwin and The Crocmen. A year later on 17 November 2007 she released her first single "Trouble in the Jungle". This was the only single to feature her rapping. "Trouble in the Jungle" includes a tribute song to her father Steve called "My Daddy The Crocodile Hunter". Irwin released two fitness DVDs for children and sang "Trouble in the Jungle" on The Today Show with The Crocmen in November 2007. At this point, Irwin started learning how to play the piano. She then released her second album Bindi Kid Fitness 2 Jungle Dance Party on 11 October 2008. Irwin originally had a band called "Bindi and The Crocmen". As of 2009 she had a new band called "Bindi and The Jungle Girls". Irwin eventually released her third album in 2013, Bindi and The Jungle Girls African Dance Party. She released her fourth album, Bindi and The Jungle Girls Bindi's Island Dance Party in 2016.

Appearances in other media
In September 2006, at age 8, Irwin appeared on the cover of the Australian magazine New Idea, the youngest person to have done so in the magazine's 104-year history. The following June, Irwin hosted a US television special about her father called My Daddy the Crocodile Hunter. Irwin appeared on The Ellen DeGeneres Show in early 2007. At that time, she was also scheduled for appearances on the Late Show with David Letterman and an attendance with Russell Crowe at a major dinner. She was promoting her new video, Bindi Kid Fitness, and fulfilling her role as a newly appointed "tourism ambassador" for Australia. Later that month, Irwin appeared on Larry King Live, where she stated that creative writing was her favourite subject and maths her least favourite. She also said that she enjoyed being homeschooled because she and her teachers were such good friends.

Alongside George Lopez and Tyler James Williams, Irwin presented the award for "Favorite Male Singer" at the 2007 Kids' Choice Awards, which was won by the show's host Justin Timberlake. With help from Glenn Robbins, Irwin also presented the award for 'Most Outstanding Children's Show' at the Logie Awards of 2007, which was won by The Upside Down Show.

In late November 2007, Irwin appeared with her mother Terri in the 81st Annual Macy's Thanksgiving Day Parade and performed songs from her album Trouble in the Jungle with The Crocmen on a jungle animal float.

She starred as Kirra in the movie Free Willy: Escape from Pirate's Cove, released on 23 March 2010.

In 2012, Irwin hosted a wildlife-themed game show called Bindi's Bootcamp. Filmed at Australia Zoo, the contestants were put through "adventure challenges" to educate and test their wildlife knowledge. It was produced in association with Sydney-based Sticky Pictures, under commission from ABC, and debuted in July on ABC3.

Irwin starred in the sequel to Nim's Island playing the lead character Nim, originally played by Abigail Breslin.

In 2012, Irwin appeared as Sunday Clovers on the episode "Mirror rorriM" of the Canadian television series, My Babysitter's a Vampire.

In 2013, Irwin made a brief appearance on the Australian TV series Big Brother to surprise housemate Tim, who had mentioned her several times throughout the series, saying "I want to thank you for being an incredible Wildlife Warrior. I hope when you're out of the house you can come visit me".

In March 2014, Irwin appeared on Good Morning America with her family, where she announced a partnership with animal theme park company SeaWorld.

In August 2015, Irwin was announced as a competitor on season 21 of the American reality television series Dancing with the Stars, paired with five-time champion Derek Hough. Since Irwin was a minor during the competition, she required special permission by California courts to perform. Irwin and Hough were declared the winners of the season on 24 November 2015.

On 1 April 2019, Irwin appeared as a guest judge during week 7 of Australian Dancing with the Stars season 16.

Awards
On 4 May 2008, Irwin won the Most Popular New Female Talent Logie Award. Then on 13 June 2008, at the age of nine, she became the youngest performer ever to win a Daytime Emmy Award when she won the award for "Outstanding Performer in a Children's Series". The previous record was held by Camryn Grimes, who won the "Outstanding Younger Actress in a Drama Series" at age ten for her performance in The Young and the Restless. In October 2014, Irwin was awarded Young Conservationist of the Year by the Australian Geographic Society.

Personal life
In July 2019, Irwin became engaged to Chandler Powell, an American professional wakeboarder from Florida. The couple first met as teenagers at Australia Zoo in November 2013. On 25 March 2020, they were married in a private ceremony at Australia Zoo. Irwin gave birth to a daughter on 25 March 2021, which was their first wedding anniversary.

In March 2023, Irwin posted a post-surgery photo after suffering what she described as "insurmountable fatigue, pain and nausea" from endometriosis. She stated that she has been suffering for a decade.

Discography

Albums

Video albums

Singles

Filmography

Television

Film

Internet

Dancing with the Stars performances
Irwin, who was partnered with Derek Hough, won season 21 of Dancing with the Stars (U.S.) on 24 November 2015. Irwin and Hough held the record for the most perfect scores, with eight. This record was broken by Jordan Fisher in season 25.

1 Score by guest judge Alfonso Ribeiro.

2 This week only, for "Partner Switch-Up" week, Irwin performed with Valentin Chmerkovskiy instead of Hough. Hough performed with Alexa PenaVega.

3 Score given by guest judge Maksim Chmerkovskiy.

4 Score given by guest judge Olivia Newton-John.

Awards and nominations

ARIA Music Awards

Logie Awards

References

External links

 Story of Steve and Terri at Animal Planet
 Australia Zoo
 
 
 

1998 births
21st-century Australian actresses
Living people
Australian conservationists
Actresses from Queensland
Australian child singers
Australian child actresses
Australian children's television presenters
Australian women singers
Australian film actresses
Australian people of American descent
Australian people of English descent
Australian people of Irish descent
Australian people of Swedish descent
Australian television actresses
Australian television personalities
Women television personalities
Australian women television presenters
Dancing with the Stars (American TV series) winners
Daytime Emmy Award winners
Bindi
Logie Award winners
Participants in American reality television series
People from Nambour, Queensland
People from the Sunshine Coast, Queensland
Steve Irwin
People with Endometriosis